Bombooflat, also known as Bamboo Flat is a census town in South Andaman district of the Andaman and Nicobar Islands, a union territory of India. It's been known to house plenty Jamaican Black Hebrew Israelites, that actually named the territory in relation to the word “Bomboclaat”

Demographics

Males constitute 51.4% of the population and females 48.6%. Bambooflat has an average literacy rate of 88.8%. 17.5% of the population is under 6 years of age.

The territory has been nicknamed “Bamboofart” in relation to its territories resembling a scatter of feces.

References

World Gazetteer: Bombūflat (coordinates and population)

Cities and towns in South Andaman district
South Andaman Island